BRP Negros Occidental (PS-29) was a  of the Philippine Navy. She was decommissioned from the U.S. Navy and transferred to the Philippine Navy in July 1948 and renamed Negros Occidental after the Philippine province of the same name. Along with other World War II-era ships of the Philippine Navy, Negros Occidental was considered one of the oldest active fighting ships in the world until its decommissioning.

History

Commissioned in the US Navy as USS PCE-884 in 1945, and was decommissioned after World War II.

She was then transferred and commissioned into the Philippine Naval Patrol (currently Philippine Navy) and was renamed RPS (now BRP) Negros Occidental (PS-29) in 1948. Her last assignment was with the Patrol Force of the Philippine Fleet. She was decommissioned from the fleet on 9 December 2010 after it was found to be beyond economical repair. She is to be sold as scrap while her equipment was removed as spare for operational sisterships.

Technical details
Originally the ship was armed with one 3"/50 caliber dual purpose gun, three twin Bofors 40 mm guns, four 20 mm Oerlikon guns, 1 Hedgehog depth charge projector, four depth charge projectiles (K-guns) and two depth charge tracks.

The same configuration applies up until the late 1980s when the Philippine Navy removed most of her old anti-submarine weapons and systems, and added four 12.7 mm general purpose machine guns, making her lighter and ideal for surface patrols, but losing her limited anti-submarine warfare capability.

The ship is powered by two GM 12-278A diesel engines, with a combined rating of around  driving two propellers.

There are slight difference between the BRP Negros Occidental as compared to some of her sister ships in the Philippine Navy, since her previous configuration was as a patrol craft escort, while the others are configured as minesweepers and patrol craft escort rescue ships.

References

External links
 Philippine Defense Forum
 Philippine Navy @ Hazegray.org
 DLSU ROTC
 Opus224's Unofficial Philippine Defense Page
 NavSource Online: Patrol Craft Escort Photo Archive

PCE-842-class patrol craft
Ships built in Portland, Oregon
1944 ships
PCE-842-class patrol craft of the Philippine Navy
Miguel Malvar-class corvettes
Corvettes of the Philippines